Lidija Vukićević (born 20 July 1962) is a Serbian film and TV actress and politician.

From 2004 until 2012, she was also politically involved with the Serbian Radical Party (SRS), serving as their MP in the Serbian parliament from 2007 until 2012.

She originates from the Vasojevići clan.

Acting career
Best known for playing the role of Violeta a.k.a. Viki, daughter of the central Popadić family on the hugely popular Bolji život television series, Vukićević's acting career peaked throughout the mid-to-late 1980s and early 1990s.

Following a few small roles on film and television, her cinematic career in Yugoslavia was launched in 1985 after being cast in 's , the seventh instalment of the popular folksy comedy film series Lude godine. Twenty two years of age at the time, Vukićević played the role of sexy housemaid Lilika.

Her attractive looks and sex appeal were a prominent feature of all of her early cinematic roles.

Political career
In 2004, Vukićević joined the opposition Serbian Radical Party (SRS), a political organization whose leader Vojislav Šešelj had already been detained in The Hague for over a year, awaiting trial at the international criminal tribunal. In his absence, the party that won 27.62% of the popular vote at the most recent parliamentary election and held 82 National Assembly seats (more than any other individual party in Serbia at the time), was led by Tomislav Nikolić, Aleksandar Vučić, and Dragan Todorović.

For the 2007 parliamentary elections, Vukićević was named on the SRS electoral list. Following the election—that again saw the party perform successfully with 29.07% of the popular vote—she became one of its 81 MPs. The following year, in September 2008, as the SRS underwent a bitter split—with many of its members, led by top-ranking officials Nikolić and Vučić, leaving to form the Serbian Progressive Party (SNS)—Vukićević decided to stay loyal to the SRS.

Along with a significant number of prominent party members, she left the SRS following the 2012 elections where the party won only 4.62% of the popular vote—below the 5% parliamentary threshold, meaning it failed to obtain any parliamentary seats. Reportedly, Šešelj's personnel decisions following the election fiasco, such as naming Vjerica Radeta as the new party vice-president, precipitated the mass exodus from the SRS.

Personal life
During the early 1990s, Vukićević married Red Star Belgrade footballer Mitar Mrkela. The couple divorced in 2000. They have a son Andrej Mrkela, born in 1992, who is also a professional footballer and currently plays for Eskişehirspor.

In the early 2000s, she was reportedly in a relationship with the Yugoslav Army's former Chief of the General Staff, colonel general Nebojša Pavković.

References

External links
 

1962 births
Living people
Serbian actresses
Serbian television actresses
People from Kraljevo
Serbian Radical Party politicians
21st-century Serbian women politicians
21st-century Serbian politicians